Fields Creek may refer to:

Fields Creek (Missouri), a stream in Missouri
Fields Creek (Kanawha River tributary), a stream in West Virginia